Ellen Semple Barry  (née Semple; October 4, 1898 – June 12, 1995) was an American portrait artist whose subjects included Dean Acheson, William S. Paley, Vincent Astor, W. Averell Harriman and Pablo Picasso. Some of her portraits are hung in the National Portrait Gallery. She was married to the playwright Philip Barry.

Biography
Ellen Semple was the daughter of Lorenzo Semple, a Southern lawyer, and Mary Semple.

Portraits hung in the National Portrait Gallery include Lady Bird Johnson, Archibald MacLeish and Eleanor Roosevelt.

References

1898 births
1995 deaths
American portrait painters
20th-century American painters